The Mu variant, also known as lineage B.1.621 or VUI-21JUL-1, is one of the variants of SARS-CoV-2, the virus that causes COVID-19. It was first detected in Colombia in January 2021 and was designated by the WHO as a variant of interest on August 30, 2021. The WHO said the variant has mutations that indicate a risk of resistance to the current vaccines and stressed that further studies were needed to better understand it. Outbreaks of the Mu variant were reported in South America and Europe. The B.1.621 lineage has a sublineage, labeled B.1.621.1 under the PANGO nomenclature, which has already been detected in more than 20 countries worldwide.

Under the simplified naming scheme proposed by the World Health Organization, B.1.621 was labeled "Mu variant", and was considered a variant of interest (VOI), but not a variant of concern.

Classification

Naming 
In January 2021, the lineage was first documented in Colombia and was named as lineage B.1.621.

On July 1, 2021, Public Health England (PHE) named lineage B.1.621 VUI-21JUL-1.

On August 30, 2021, the World Health Organization (WHO) named lineage B.1.621 Mu variant.

Mutations 
The Mu genome has a total number of 21 mutations, including 9 amino acid mutations, all of which are in the virus's spike protein code: T95I, Y144S, Y145N, R346K, E484K or the escape mutation, N501Y, D614G, P681H, and D950N.  It has an insertion of one amino acid at position 144/145 of the spike protein, giving a total mutation YY144–145TSN. That mutation is conventionally notated as Y144S and Y145N because insertions would break a lot of comparison tools. It also features a frame-shift deletion of four nucleotides in ORF3a that generates a stop codon two amino acids. The mutation is labeled as V256I, N257Q, and P258*. The list of defining mutations are: S: T95I, Y144S, Y145N, R346K, E484K, N501Y, D614G, P681H, and D950N; ORF1a: T1055A, T1538I, T3255I, Q3729R; ORF1b: P314L, P1342S; N: T205I, ORF3a: Q57H, V256I, N257Q, P258*; ORF8: T11K, P38S, S67F. Mutations in viruses are not new. All viruses, including SARS-CoV-2, undergo change over time. Most of these changes are inconsequential, but some can alter properties to make these viruses more virulent or escape the treatment or vaccines.

On August 31, 2021, the WHO released an update which stated that the "Mu variant has a constellation of mutations that indicate potential properties of immune escape", noting that preliminary studies showed some signs of this but that "this needs to be confirmed by further studies."

One such study conducted in a lab in Rome tested the effectiveness of sera collected from recipients of the BioNTech-Pfizer vaccine against the Mu variant, and found that "neutralization of SARS-CoV-2 B.1.621 lineage was robust", albeit at a lower level than that observed against the B.1 variant.

History

August 2021 
August 6: 
 Reuters reported that seven vaccinated elderly residents of a nursing home in the town of Zaventem in Belgium died after contracting the Mu variant.

August 30: 
 Japan confirmed its first two cases of the Mu variant. The variant was detected in a woman in her 40s who arrived on June 26 from the United Arab Emirates. Another woman in her 50s who arrived in Japan on July 5 from the UK also had the Mu variant. Both patients were asymptomatic.

September 2021 
September 2:
 The Central Epidemic Command Center (CECC) announced Taiwan's first ever case of the Mu variant. The patient is a Taiwanese woman in her 60s who returned from the United States and already had 2 doses of the Pfizer vaccine. She had received the first dose of the Pfizer vaccine in the United States on July 5 and the second on July 26. When she returned to Taiwan on August 3, she did not report any symptoms, but a test administered at the airport revealed that she was positive for COVID-19.
 Guatemala reported its first two cases of the Mu variant in two female patients, aged 19 and 25. Both patients had no travel and vaccination history. The patients reside in the central department of Guatemala, where the capital, Guatemala City, is located.
 Infectious-disease expert Anthony Fauci announced that while the United States government was "keeping a very close eye" on the Mu variant, it was not an "immediate threat right now" within the U.S. The Delta variant was accounting for 99% of U.S. cases of COVID.

September 3:
 Greece confirmed its first six cases of the Mu variant in the country. Four of them are imported cases.
 Hong Kong confirmed its first three cases of the Mu variant. Two of the patients – a 19-year-old man and a 22-year-old woman had flown in from Colombia and were confirmed to have the Mu variant in early June, while the other, a 26-year-old woman, arrived from the United States. She was confirmed infected on July 24. Hong Kong also reported four new imported COVID-19 cases, all involving domestic workers who arrived from the Philippines.
 South Korea confirmed the country's first cases of the Mu variant. The Korea Disease Control and Prevention Agency (KDCA) said that the variant was confirmed in three imported cases from Mexico, United States and Colombia.

September 4:
 According to the Health Protection Surveillance Centre (HPSC), four cases of the new Mu COVID-19 variant, first discovered in Colombia, had been identified in Ireland. Two of the four cases are associated with the sublineage of the Mu variant.
 The Minister of Health of Peru, reported that the number of reported cases of the Mu variant of the coronavirus in the country increased to 86. Peru registered its first case of the Mu variant on May 12 from Moquegua. Since then, the National Institute of Health (INS) has reported 2 more cases in May, 12 in June, 37 in July, and 34 in August. According to the Peru Ministry of Health (MINSA), the Mu variant is present in the Constitutional Province of Callao with 7 cases reported and the 14 regions of the country: Áncash with 2 cases, Arequipa with 3 cases, Ayacucho with a total of 2 cases, Cajamarca with a case, Cusco with also a total of 1 case, Huancavelica with also 1 case reported, Ica with at least 4 cases, Lima with a total of 45 cases reported, Madre de Dios with 10 cases, Moquegua with 3 cases, Piura with a case, San Martin with also a case reported, Tacna with 1 case reported as well and Tumbes with at least 4 cases reported.

September 7:
 The U.S. Virgin Islands confirmed the presence of the Mu variant in the country.
 Turkey has detected its first Mu variant cases. It has been identified in at least two individuals.

September 8:
 Saint Vincent and the Grenadines confirmed the presence of the Mu variant in the country with five cases reported, which have been detected between July 9 and August 19, 2021.

September 9:
 Twenty-six cases of the Mu variant have been confirmed in Jamaica from a total of 92 samples which were sent for testing to the Atlanta-based Centers for Disease Control on August 21.
 Argentina confirmed the presence of the Mu variant in the country with one case reported. The patient is a 33-year-old woman who previously had two doses of the COVID-19 vaccine. The patient resides in the San Martín department, in the north of the province of Salta. The patient presented mild symptoms and did not require hospitalization.

September 16:
In Brazil, cases of the Mu variant have been identified in 4 states: two cases were reported in Amazonas, as well as in Ceará, 7 cases in Minas Gerais and a case in Rio de Janeiro.

September 18:
Finland detected its first cases of the Mu variant in the country.

Statistics

See also 

COVID-19 pandemic in Colombia
 Variants of SARS-CoV-2: Alpha, Beta, Gamma, Delta, Epsilon, Zeta, Eta, Theta, Iota, Kappa, Lambda, Omicron

References

External links 
 Tracking of Variants: VOI Mu GH (B.1.621+B.1.621.1) first detected in Colombia
 Mu Variant Report
 PANGO lineages: New Variant Report - Report on global distribution of lineage B.1.621

S012
COVID-19 pandemic in Colombia